Trichophya is a genus of beetles belonging to the family Staphylinidae.

The species of this genus are found in Europe and Northern America.

Species:
 Trichophya andrewesi Cameron, 1944 
 Trichophya antennalis Cameron, 1932

References

Staphylinidae
Staphylinidae genera